The 2016–17 Montenegrin First League (known as 1. CFL 2016–17) was the eleventh season of the top-tier football in Montenegro. Mladost Podgorica are the defending champions. The season began on 6 August 2016 and ended on 27 May 2017; the relegation play-offs will follow.

Format of competition

A total of 12 teams will participate in this edition of the First Montenegrin League. Mornar was relegated to 2016–17 Montenegrin Second League. They were replaced with FK Jedinstvo Bijelo Polje.

This is the last season of Prva CFL with 12 participants. From the 2017–18 season, there will be 10 clubs in the top-tier rank of Montenegro. At the end of the 2016–17 season, the three worst-placed teams in the league will be directly relegated to the Second Montenegrin League. Additionally, the 8th and 9th-placed teams will take part in play-offs against the 2nd and 3rd-placed teams from the Second League.

Teams and stadiums
From the first time in history, championship title from the previous season will defend FK Mladost Podgorica.
Among 12 members which are participating in Montenegrin First League 2016–17, there are 11 members from the previous season – FK Bokelj, FK Budućnost, FK Dečić, OFK Grbalj, FK Iskra, FK Lovćen, FK Mladost, OFK Petrovac, FK Rudar, FK Sutjeska and FK Zeta. New member is FK Jedinstvo, which played their last games in the First League during the 2012–13 season.
The only town which had more than one member of the First League is Podgorica, with its teams Budućnost and Mladost. Except that, two other clubs are from the cities of Podgorica Capital territory – Zeta from Golubovci and Dečić from Tuzi. There are two clubs from the territory of Municipality of Kotor – Bokelj from Kotor and Grbalj from Radanovići.
First time since foundation of the First Montenegrin League, at the start of the season, managers of all clubs were from Montenegro.

League table

Results
The schedule consists of three rounds. During the first two rounds, each team played each other once home-and-away for a total of 22 games. The pairings of the third round were then set according to the standings after the first two rounds, giving every team a third game against each opponent for a total of 33 games per team.

First and second round

Third round
Key numbers for pairing determination (number marks position after 22 games):

Relegation play-offs
The eighth and ninth-placed teams in this season's league, Rudar and Petrovac respectively, will each pair off against the runners-up and third-placed team from the 2016–17 Montenegrin Second League in the relegation play-offs, to be played over two legs. The draw was made on 29 May 2017. The two winners will play in next season's top-flight.

Summary

Matches

Petrovac won 5–1 on aggregate.

Rudar won 3–1 on aggregate.

Top scorers

See also 
 Montenegrin First League
 2016–17 Montenegrin Second League

References

External links 
 Football Association of Montenegro – official site
 1. CFL 2016–17 on Soccerway

Montenegrin First League seasons
Monte
1